Glenn Graham (January 17, 1904 – July 1986) was an American athlete who competed in the men's pole vault.  He competed in Athletics at the 1924 Summer Olympics in Paris and won silver, behind fellow American pole vaulter Lee Barnes who won gold.

References

1904 births
1986 deaths
Athletes (track and field) at the 1924 Summer Olympics
American male pole vaulters
Olympic silver medalists for the United States in track and field
Medalists at the 1924 Summer Olympics